Ngāti Te Hina may refer to:

 Ngāti Te Hina (Ngāti Kahungunu), a Ngāti Kahungunu sub-tribe
 Ngāti Te Hina (Rangitāne), a Rangitāne sub-tribe